Daniel Morales (23 April 1928 – 5 August 2007) was a Chilean footballer. He played in three matches for the Chile national football team in 1957. He was also part of Chile's squad for the 1957 South American Championship.

References

External links
 
 

1928 births
2007 deaths
Chilean footballers
Chile international footballers
Place of birth missing
Association football defenders
Magallanes footballers